New York City has the largest population of Italian Americans in the United States of America as well as North America, many of whom inhabit ethnic enclaves in Brooklyn, the Bronx, Manhattan, Queens, and Staten Island. New York is home to the third largest Italian population outside of Italy, behind Buenos Aires, Argentina (first) and São Paulo, Brazil (second). Over 2.6 million Italians and Italian-Americans live in the greater New York metro area, with about 800,000 living within one of the five New York City boroughs. This makes Italian Americans the largest ethnic group in the New York metro area.

The first Italian to reside in New York was Pietro Cesare Alberti, a Venetian seaman who, in 1635, settled in the Dutch colony of New Amsterdam that would eventually become New York. A small wave of Protestants, known as Waldensians, who were of French and northern Italian heritage (specifically Piedmontese), occurred during the 17th century, with the majority coming between 1654 and 1663. A 1671 Dutch record indicates that, in 1656 alone, the Duchy of Savoy near Turin, Italy, had exiled 300 Waldensians due to their Protestant faith.

The largest wave of Italian immigration to the United States took place in the late 19th century and early 20th century. Between 1820 and 1978, 5.3 million Italians immigrated to the United States, including over two million between 1900 and 1910. Only Irish and Germans immigrated in larger numbers.

The first New York  neighborhood to be settled by large numbers of Italian immigrants – primarily from Southern Italy (mostly from Sicily) – was East Harlem, which became the first part of the city to be known as "Little Italy". The area, which lies east of Lexington Avenue between 96th and 116th Streets and east of Madison Avenue between 116th and 125th Streets, featured people from different regions of Italy on each cross street, as immigrants from each area chose to live in close proximity to each other.

"Italian Harlem" approached its peak in the 1930s, with over 100,000 Italian-Americans living in its crowded, run-down apartment buildings. The 1930 census showed that 81 percent of the population of Italian Harlem consisted of first- or second- generation Italian Americans. This was somewhat less than the concentration of Italian Americans in the Lower East Side’s Little Italy with 88 percent; Italian Harlem’s total population, however, was three times that of Little Italy. Remnants of the neighborhood's Italian heritage are kept alive by the Giglio Society of East Harlem. Every year on the second weekend of August, the Feast of Our Lady of Mount Carmel is celebrated and the "Dancing of the Giglio" is performed for thousands of visitors.

After World War II, the original Italian settlements such as East Harlem declined as Italian Americans moved to the North Bronx, Queens and Brooklyn's southern tier.  The geographic shift coincided with a new wave of Italian immigration.  An estimated 129,000 to 150,000 Italian immigrants entered New York City between 1945 and 1973.  Bypassing Manhattan, they settled in Italian American neighborhoods in the outer boroughs and helped reinvigorate Italian culture and community institutions.  With the influx of postwar immigrants, Bensonhurst became the largest Italian community in New York City, with 150,000 Italian Americans in the 1980 census.

The best-known "Little Italy" in Manhattan is the area currently called that, which centers around Mulberry Street. This settlement, however, is rapidly becoming part of the adjacent Chinatown as the older Italian residents die and their children move elsewhere. As of the 2000 census, 692,739 New Yorkers reported Italian ancestry, making them the largest European ethnic group in the city. In 2011, the American Community Survey found there were 49,075 persons of Italian birth in New York.

Italian-American neighborhoods in New York

Arthur Avenue (the Bronx's Little Italy)
Bay Ridge, Brooklyn
Bensonhurst, Brooklyn (Brooklyn's Little Italy)
Belmont, Bronx
Bergen Beach, Brooklyn
Carroll Gardens, Brooklyn
City Island, Bronx
Cobble Hill, Brooklyn
Dyker Heights, Brooklyn
East Village, Manhattan
Greenwich Village, Manhattan
Howard Beach, Queens
Middle Village, Queens
Ridgewood, Queens
Mill Basin, Brooklyn
Morris Park, Bronx
Mulberry Street, Little Italy, Manhattan
Ozone Park, Queens
Pelham Bay, Bronx
Pleasant Avenue, East Harlem (Italian Harlem), Manhattan
Schuylerville, Bronx
Staten Island
Throggs Neck, Bronx
Whitestone, Queens
Williamsburg, Brooklyn
Tottenville, Staten Island
Eltingville, Staten Island
Annadale, Staten Island
Huguenot, Staten Island

Education
The Italian international private school La Scuola d'Italia Guglielmo Marconi, serving grades Pre-Kindergarten through 12, is located in Manhattan. It is the sole bilingual English-Italian day school in North America. Despite the large Italian American population, the vast majority of bilingual day schools in North America are French speaking.

Institutions
The Consulate-General of Italy in New York is located in the Upper East Side of Manhattan.

The John D. Calandra Italian American Institute, founded in 1979 and located in Midtown Manhattan, is an academic institute that studies matters pertaining to the history of Italians in the United States.

The Italian American Museum is located in Manhattan's Little Italy. Located in a former bank, Banca Stabile, its current building had a "soft opening" in September 2008, and a formal opening in October.

Churches 

Church of the Most Precious Blood, Little Italy
Our Lady of Pompeii Church, Greenwich Village
 St. Anthony of Padua Church, South Village

Recreation
Columbus Day and the San Gennaro Festival are celebrated in New York.

References

 
Ethnic groups in New York City
Italian-American history